Cryptocephalus downiei, or Downie's spotted leaf beetle, is a species of case-bearing leaf beetle in the family Chrysomelidae. It is found in North America. The specific epithet downiei honors American psychologist and coleopterist Norville Downie.

References

Further reading

 
 
 

downiei
Articles created by Qbugbot
Beetles described in 2000